Parry Peak, elevation , is a summit in the Front Range of central Colorado. The peak is on the continental divide southeast of Winter Park in the Arapahoe National Forest. The name honors Charles Christopher Parry, a botanist who made extensive studies of the Colorado mountain flora in the 1860s. It is one of the 637 thirteeners (peaks over 13,000 ft elevation) in the state of Colorado and lies along the Continental Divide Trail.

Parry Peak is also the highest peak of the James Group of the Front Range of Colorado.

See also

List of mountain peaks of North America
List of mountain peaks of the United States
List of mountain peaks of Colorado

References

External links

Parry Peak on 13ers.com
Parry Peak on listsofjohn.com
Parry Peak on peakery.com
Parry Peak on summitpost.org

Mountains of Colorado
Mountains of Clear Creek County, Colorado
Mountains of Grand County, Colorado
North American 4000 m summits